Austin Smith is an American politician. He is a member for the 29th district of the Arizona House of Representatives, alongside Steve Montenegro, since 2023.

Life and career 
Smith was a conservative youth leader. He is a former director of Turning Point USA, the far-right conservative youth organization founded by Charlie Kirk with strong ties to former President Donald J. Trump. Smith is a small beef cattle producer in Wittmann, Arizona. 

In January 2021, Smith was elected chairman of the Arizona Young Republican Federation. He oversees Turning Point Action - Charlie Kirk's 501(c)4 political wing of Turning Point USA, a group accused of helping incite the January 6th Capitol Riot and Insurrection. 

In August 2022, Smith defeated Hop Nguyen and Trey Terry in the Republican primary election for the 29th district of the Arizona House of Representatives. In November 2022, he defeated Scott Podeyn along with Steve Montenegro in the general election. He assumed office in 2023.

References 

Living people
Place of birth missing (living people)
Year of birth missing (living people)
Republican Party members of the Arizona House of Representatives
21st-century American politicians